Léonard Lévesque (May 23, 1935 – August 26, 2017) was a Canadian politician. Born in Mont-Carmel, Quebec, Lévesque represented the electoral district of Kamouraska-Témiscouata in the National Assembly of Quebec from 1976 to 1985. He was a member of the Parti Québécois.

Biography
Lévesque died on August 26, 2017 in La Pocatière, Quebec. He was aged 82 years and 3 months.

Lévesque studied at a trade school in Montreal and worked briefly in electronic before returning to work on the family farm. He was Vice President of the Caisse populaire of Mont-Carmel.

Lévesque maintained a low presence after his life in politics.

References

External links

1935 births
2017 deaths
Parti Québécois MNAs
People from Bas-Saint-Laurent
French Quebecers